Devin Talbott (born September 20, 1976) is an American entrepreneur and private investor, and the son of foreign policy expert Strobe Talbott.

Biography
Talbott grew up in Washington D.C. and attended Amherst College, where he was a four-year varsity soccer player. He also earned JD and MBA degrees from Georgetown University. Talbott began his investment banking career at Lazard and then worked for former Defense Secretary William Cohen's merchant bank, TCG Financial Partners. After that, Talbott became a vice president of investment firm D.E. Shaw before branching out to found Enlightenment Capital, an aerospace, defense & government focused private investment firm, in 2012. Since its founding, Enlightenment Capital has raised four funds. Talbott also co-founded Generation Engage, a non-profit focused on engaging young voters in politics and civics, with his brother Adrian and Jay Rockefeller's son Justin.

Talbott was recognized in M&A Advisor’s ‘’40 Under 40,” as an emerging leader in the financing industry before the age of 40. He was also named by Washingtonian magazine as one of Washington’s Top Tech Leaders.

Talbott served as a term member of the Council of Foreign Relations, a former advisory board member of the Aspen Security Forum, and currently sits on the board of the non-profit DC Scores, a non-profit that utilizes soccer, poetry, and service learning to support middle schoolers in at-risk neighborhoods. Talbott and DC United coach and former player Ben Olsen lead DC Score’s annual fundraiser, One Night One Goal.

Talbott was a part owner of the Washington Spirit of the NWSL in 2021 when the club won its first league championship. He is currently a part owner of DC United of Major League Soccer.

References

External links
http://enlightenment-cap.com/

1976 births
Living people
People from Chevy Chase, Maryland
21st-century American businesspeople
Amherst College alumni